Meri Shehzadi (transl. My Princess) is a 2022 Pakistani drama television series written by Zanjabeel Asim Shah, directed by Qasim Ali Mureed and produced by Momina Duraid. It is loosely based on the life story of Princess Diana, ex-wife of then Prince and now King Charles III.

Plot
Dania is a quiet, scholastic girl raised by her grandparents with much affection and love as her mother passed away in her childhood. Her grandmother blames her father, Salahuddin as he did second marriage and ignored his daughter due to his loyalty towards his second wife and their son. Her stepmother forbids her father to meet her.

Chief Minister of the province, Riaz Uddin, the elder brother of Salahuddin, due to deteriorated health decides to marry off his son Shehroze with Dania, so that he can stay here permanently, not leaving for U.S.A. and could focus on his political career like him.
Soon after, Riaz Uddin dies and Dania gets married to Shehroze.
On her first wedding night, it reveals to her that Shehroze has already an American wife, Cam, with whom he has a son also.

Meri Shehzadi (old name Meri Shehzadi Diana) is based on the true story of Lady Diana of UK and Wales. The story highly focuses on the life of Lady Diana, her marriage life, her kingdom, and her rule.

Cast

Production

Background and development 
In October 2021, screenwriter Zanjabeel Asim Shah in an interview said that she is very hopeful that her upcoming project Meri Shehzadi Diana will be a revolutionary project. In September 2022, it stated in a press release that the main character of the series, Dania is inspired by the Princess Diana and the character will be a political leader and philanthropist like her.

Casting 
In June 2022, Farhan Saeed confirmed that he and Urwa are part of it. In same month, there were reports that Imran Abbas is also part of the project. However, in August 2022, Galaxy Lollywood reported that both the male leads, Saeed and Abbas has been opt out of the project. Ali Rehman Khan has replaced the Saeed while Bilal Abbas Khan may replace Abbas. About Saeed's casting in the series, the director hoped to cast him in a surprise character on his availability. The other cast members include Atiqa Odho, Qavi Khan, Sonia Mishal and Najiba Faiz.

Reception 
While reviewing the first episode, a reviewer from Galaxy Lollywood praised the direction with stating the execution as crisp, and storyline as fresh. The reviewer also praised the Hocane's performance. Mag - The Weekly praised the performances of the Hilaly and Khan but criticised the Hocane's performance, stating that she has same expressions in each scene.

See also
 Urwa Hocane
 Ali Rehman Khan
 List of programs broadcast by Hum TV

References

Pakistani television series
2022 Pakistani television series debuts
Cultural depictions of Diana, Princess of Wales